Jameel Sadik "Jim" Al-Khalili  (born 20 September 1962) is an Iraqi-British theoretical physicist, author and broadcaster. He is professor of theoretical physics and chair in the public engagement in science at the University of Surrey. He is a regular broadcaster and presenter of science programmes on BBC radio and television, and a frequent commentator about science in other British media.

In 2014, Al-Khalili was named as a RISE (Recognising Inspirational Scientists and Engineers) leader by the UK's Engineering and Physical Sciences Research Council (EPSRC). He was President of Humanists UK between January 2013 and January 2016.

Early life and education 
Al-Khalili was born in Baghdad in 1962. His father was an Iraqi Air Force engineer, and his English mother was a librarian. Al-Khalili settled permanently in the UK in 1979. After completing (and retaking) his A-levels over three years until 1982, he studied physics at the University of Surrey and graduated with a Bachelor of Science degree in 1986. He stayed on at Surrey to pursue a Doctor of Philosophy degree in nuclear reaction theory, which he obtained in 1989, rather than accepting a job offer from the National Physical Laboratory.

Career and research 

In 1989, Al-Khalili was awarded a Science and Engineering Research Council (SERC) postdoctoral fellowship at University College London, after which he returned to Surrey in 1991, first as a research assistant, then as a lecturer. In 1994, Al-Khalili was awarded an Engineering and Physical Sciences Research Council (EPSRC) Advanced Research Fellowship for five years, during which time he established himself as a leading expert on mathematical models of exotic atomic nuclei. He has published widely in his field.

Al-Khalili is a professor of physics at the University of Surrey, where he also holds a chair in the Public Engagement in Science. He has been a trustee (2006–2012) and vice president (2008–2011) of the British Science Association. He also held an EPSRC Senior Media Fellowship.

Al-Khalili was awarded the Royal Society of London Michael Faraday Prize for science communication for 2007 and elected an Honorary Fellow of the British Association for the Advancement of Science. He has been a Fellow of the Institute of Physics since 2000, when he also received the Institute's Public Awareness of Physics Award. He has lectured widely both in the UK and around the world, particularly for the British Council. He is a member of the British Council Science and Engineering Advisory Group, a member of the Royal Society Equality and Diversity Panel, an external examiner for the Open University Department of Physics and Astronomy, a member of the Editorial Board for the open access Journal PMC Physics A, and Associate Editor of Advanced Science Letters. He is also a member of the Advisory Committee for the Cheltenham Science Festival.

In 2007, he was a judge on the BBC Samuel Johnson Prize for non-fiction and has been a celebrity judge at the National Science & Engineering Competition Finals at The Big Bang Fair. He was appointed Officer of the Order of the British Empire (OBE) in the 2008 Birthday Honours. In 2013 he was awarded an Honorary Degree (DSc) from the University of London. Al-Khalili was elected as a Fellow of the Royal Society in 2018.

He was appointed Commander of the Order of the British Empire (CBE) in the 2021 Birthday Honours for services to science and public engagement in STEM.

Broadcasting 
As a broadcaster, Al-Khalili is frequently on television and radio and also writes articles for the British press. In 2004, he co-presented the Channel 4 documentary The Riddle of Einstein's Brain, produced by Icon Films. His big break as a presenter came in 2007 with Atom, a three-part series on BBC Four about the history of our understanding of the atom and atomic physics. This was followed by a special archive edition of Horizon, "The Big Bang".

In early 2009, Al-Khalili presented the BBC Four three-part series Science and Islam about the leap in scientific knowledge that took place in the Islamic world between the 8th and 14th centuries. He has contributed to programmes ranging from Tomorrow's World, BBC Four's Mind Games, The South Bank Show to BBC One's Bang Goes the Theory. In October 2011, he began a programme on famous contemporary scientists on Radio Four, called The Life Scientific. The first of this series featured his interview with Sir Paul Nurse. He has since interviewed a series of notable scientists, including Richard Dawkins, Alice Roberts, James Lovelock, Steven Pinker, Martin Rees, Jocelyn Bell Burnell, Mark Walport and Tim Hunt, and he has himself been interviewed on the show by Adam Rutherford.

Al-Khalili hosts a regular "Jim meets..." interview series at the University of Surrey, which is published on the university's YouTube channel. Guests have included Sir David Attenborough, Lord (Robert) Winston, Professor Brian Cox and Rowan Williams, Archbishop of Canterbury. In 2011, Al-Khalili hosted a three-part documentary series on BBC Four entitled Shock and Awe: The Story of Electricity. In 2012, Al-Khalili presented a Horizon special on BBC 2, which examined the latest scientific developments in the quest to discover the Higgs Boson, with preliminary results from the Large Hadron Collider experiment at CERN suggesting that the elusive particle does indeed exist.

Awards and honours 
2007 – Royal Society Michael Faraday Prize for science communication
2008 – Appointed Officer of the Order of the British Empire (OBE) in 2008 Birthday Honours
2013 – Warwick Prize for Writing, shortlist, Pathfinders
2014 – RISE leader award
 2013 – Honorary Doctor of Science, Royal Holloway, University of London
2016 – Inaugural winner of the Stephen Hawking Medal for Science Communication
2017 – Honorary Doctorate, University of York
2018 – Elected a Fellow of the Royal Society (FRS)
2019 – Honorary Doctor of Science, University of St Andrews
2019 – Outstanding Achievement in Science & Technology at The Asian Awards.
2021 - Commander of the Order of the British Empire (CBE), "for Services to Science and Public Engagement in STEM."
2022 – Honorary Doctor of Science, University of Birmingham

Personal life 
Al-Khalili lives in Southsea, Portsmouth with his wife Julie. They have a son and daughter. Al-Khalili describes himself as an atheist and a humanist, remarking, "as the son of a Protestant Christian mother and a Shia Muslim father, I have nevertheless ended up without a religious bone in my body". Al-Khalili became Vice President of Humanists UK in 2016 after stepping down as its President. Al-Khalili is also a Patron of Guildford-based educational, cultural and social community hub, The Guildford Institute.

Documentaries 

 The Riddle of Einstein's Brain (2004)
 Atom (2007)
 Battle for the Beginning (2008)
 Science and Islam (2009)
 Genius of Britain: The Scientists Who Changed the World (2010)
 The Secret Life of Chaos (2010)
 Chemistry: A Volatile History (2010)
 Everything and Nothing (2011)
 Shock and Awe: The Story of Electricity (2011)
 Order and Disorder (2012)
 Light and Dark (2013)
 The Secrets of Quantum Physics (2014)
 The Beginning and End of the Universe (2016)
 Britain's Nuclear Bomb: The Inside Story (2017)
 The Joy of AI (2018)
 Breakthrough: The Ideas That Changed the World (2019)
 Secrets of the Solar System (2020)
 Secrets of Size: Atoms to Supergalaxies (2022)

Publications 
A list of Jim Al-Khalili's peer reviewed research papers can be found on Google Scholar and Scopus. His published books include:

 Nucleus: A Trip into the Heart of Matter (2001) (co-author)
 
 The House of Wisdom: How Arabic Science Saved Ancient Knowledge and Gave Us the Renaissance (2010)
 a.k.a. The House of Wisdom: The Flourishing of a Glorious Civilisation and the Golden Age of Arabic Science
 a.k.a. Pathfinders: The Golden Age of Arabic Science
 Paradox: The Nine Greatest Enigmas in Science (2012)
 Life on the Edge: The Coming of Age of Quantum Biology (2014) (co-author)

As editor
 The Euroschool Lectures on Physics with Exotic Beams, Vol. I (Lecture Notes in Physics) (2004)
 The Euroschool Lectures on Physics with Exotic Beams, Vol. II (Lecture Notes in Physics) (2006)
 The Euroschool Lectures on Physics with Exotic Beams, Vol. III (Lecture Notes in Physics) (2008)
As consultant editor

His essays, chapters and other contributions include:
 The Collins Encyclopedia of the Universe (2001)
 Scattering and Inverse Scattering in Pure and Applied Science (2001)
 Quantum Aspects of Life (2008)
 30-second Theories: The 50 Most Thought-provoking Theories in Science (2009)

Fiction
Jim Al-Khalili has written one science fiction novel:

References 

1962 births
Academics of the University of Surrey
Academics of University College London
Alumni of the University of Surrey
British sceptics
Commanders of the Order of the British Empire
English atheists
English humanists
English people of Iraqi descent
English physicists
English television presenters
Fellows of the Institute of Physics
Fellows of the Royal Society
Iraqi atheists
Iraqi emigrants to the United Kingdom
Iraqi people of English descent
Iraqi physicists
Iraqi scientists
Living people
People educated at Priory School, Portsmouth
People from Southsea
Quantum biology
Quantum physicists
Science communicators
Theoretical physicists
Writers from Baghdad